1900 in Argentine football saw English High School members joining again to the team to request their affiliation. Quilmes Rovers also returned under its new name "Quilmes Atlético Club". Both teams replaced Lobos and Lanús Athletic.

English High School won its first Argentine championship. The international Tie Cup (where teams from Buenos Aires, Rosario and Montevideo took part) was played for the first time, being won by Belgrano AC.

Primera División

The championship continued with the 4 team league format, with each team playing the other twice.

Final standings

Lower divisions

Primera B
Champion: Banfield

Primera C
Champion: English High School (youth division)

International

Tie Cup

Final

References

 
Seasons in Argentine football
1900 in South American football